Graham John May (1952 – 23 December 2006) was a weightlifting competitor for New Zealand.

He won the gold medal at the 1974 Commonwealth Games in the men's 110 kg division. He is widely known for falling on his face during a lift prior to his gold medal-winning effort. During the failed lift he fell forward with the weights rolling off the platform and into the judges area. The footage of his fall was part of the introduction to the Wide World of Sports for 20 years and is seen as iconic footage of New Zealand sport.

After a short career he stopped weightlifting in 1975 and followed Christianity. In a TV documentary in 1989, he admitted to taking performance enhancing steroids in the years leading up to his gold medal performance, although they were not illegal at the time. He offered to hand back his medal but it was declined.

References

External links 

 

2006 deaths
New Zealand male weightlifters
Commonwealth Games gold medallists for New Zealand
Weightlifters at the 1974 British Commonwealth Games
Commonwealth Games medallists in weightlifting
1952 births
20th-century New Zealand people
21st-century New Zealand people
Medallists at the 1974 British Commonwealth Games